Florijan Kadriu (born 30 September 1995 in Kërçovë) is a Macedonian professional footballer of Albanian descent who plays as a forward for Erzeni Shijak  in the Kategoria Superiore.

Club career

Tirana
On 10 August 2015, Kadriu went to a trial with the most successful team of Albania, KF Tirana. Only two days later, he successfully passed the trial after making a superb performance in the friendly against Korabi Peshkopi, scoring in the 3–0 win. He was later awarded with a three-year contract.

One month later, on 12 September, Kadriu made his Albanian Superliga debut, playing the last 23 minutes of the goalless draw against the newcomers of Bylis Ballsh at Qemal Stafa Stadium, and four days later scored the winning goal against the underdogs of Erzeni in a match valid for the first leg of the First Round of 2015–16 Albanian Cup.

Loan to Teuta
On 13 January 2016, Kadriu was loaned to fellow Albanian Superliga side Teuta Durrës until the end of the season in order to gain more experience.

Shkupi
On 3 August 2016, Kadriu was released by Tirana, which led him to join Macedonian First Football League side Shkupi on a free transfer, signing a one-year contract. He made his competitive debut four days later by playing as a substitute in a 1–1 draw against Vardar. A week later, Kadriu started for the first time in the 1–0 home defeat to Rabotnički, playing for 79 minutes.

Sabail
On 4 August 2020, Kadriu signed for Sabail FK on a contract until the end of the 2020–21 season. On 31 May 2021, Sabail announced that Kadriu had left the club.

Club statistics

References

External links

1996 births
Living people
People from Kičevo
Albanians in North Macedonia
Association football forwards
Albanian footballers
KF Tirana players
KF Teuta Durrës players
FK Shkupi players
FK Rabotnički players
FK Renova players
Sabail FK players
Kategoria Superiore players
Macedonian First Football League players
Azerbaijan Premier League players
Expatriate footballers in Azerbaijan